Okwiri Oduor (born 1988/1989) is a Kenyan writer, who won the 2014 Caine Prize for African Writing for her short story, ‘My Father’s Head’. In April 2014 she was named on the Hay Festival's Africa39 list of 39 Sub-Saharan African writers aged under 40 with potential and talent to define trends in African literature, with her story "Rag Doll" being included in the subsequent anthology edited by Ellah Allfrey, Africa39: New Writing from Africa South of the Sahara.

Life
She was born in Nairobi, Kenya. Her novella The Dream Chasers was highly commended in the 2012 Commonwealth Book Prize. Her 2014 Caine Prize entry, "My Father's Head" uses a beautiful and experimental language to explore the theme of loss and repressed memory. She became the third Kenyan winner of the prize after Binyavanga Wainaina in 2002 and Yvonne Adhiambo Owuor in 2003. Oduor is a 2014 MacDowell Colony fellow.
She is writing a novel.

References

External links
"Kenya’s Okwiri Oduor Wins The 2014 Caine Prize For African Writing", okayafrica

 Aaron Bady, "breathless babbling and blathering about Okwiri Oduor", The New Inquiry, 30 September 2014.
 Chris Brazier, "A word with Okwiri Oduor", New Internationalist, October 2014.
 Webcast at the Library of Congress, 17 April 2015

Living people
MacDowell Colony fellows
People from Nairobi
Year of birth uncertain
Kenyan writers
Caine Prize winners
Year of birth missing (living people)